Death Wish Kids may refer to:

Death Wish Kids, previous band of Pretty Girls Make Graves members Andrea Zollo and Derek Fudesco
"Death Wish Kids", song by Poison Idea from Kings of Punk, covered by Pass Out Kings on We Claim Victory